Joseph Patterson may refer to:
Joseph H. Patterson (1912–1939), American naval officer and Olympic athlete
Joseph M. Patterson (politician) (1837–1914), American politician
Joseph Medill Patterson (1879–1946), American journalist and publisher
Joseph Turner Patterson (1907–1969), Mississippi Attorney General
Joseph Victor Patterson (1882–1968), farmer and political figure in Saskatchewan
Billy Patterson (Joseph William Patterson, Jr., 1918–1998), American football player

See also
Joseph Paterson (disambiguation)